Kalamandalam Kallyanikutty Amma (1915 – 1999) was an epoch-making Mohiniyattam danseuse from Kerala in southern India. A native of Thirunavaya in Malappuram district of the state, she was instrumental in resurrecting Mohiniyattam from a dismal, near-extinct state into a mainstream Indian classical dance, rendering it formal structure and ornamentation.

Kalyanikutty Amma, one of the early-batch students of Kerala Kalamandalam, was married to the late Kathakali maestro Padma Shri Kalamandalam Krishnan Nair.

Of the two books Kalyanikutty Amma has authored, "Mohiniyattam - History and Dance Structure" is considered as an elaborate and only authentic documentation on Mohiniyattam. Noted among her disciples are her daughters Sreedevi Rajan, Kala Vijayan, Mrinalini Sarabhai, Deepti Omchery Bhalla and Smitha Rajan.

A winner of both the Kerala Sangeetha Nataka Akademi Award (1974), and the Kendra Sangeet Natak Akademi Award, Kalyanikutty Amma has also been honoured with the prestigious Kalidasa Samman in 1997–1998. She died on 12 May 1999 in Tripunithura (where the couple had settled) at the age of 84. Her son Kalasala Babu was a cinema and television actor, while her granddaughter Smitha Rajan is a noted Mohiniyattam artiste.

She got 'Kavayithri' award from the famous poet Vallathol Narayana Menon. In 1986 she got Kerala Kalamandala Fellowship. In 1992, she received the Kerala Sangeetha Nataka Akademi Fellowship.

In 2019 her grand daughter, Smitha Rajan produced a movie, "Mother of Mohiniyattam" on the life and works of Kalyanikutty Amma which is directed by Dr. Vinod Mankara.

Kalyanikutty Amma passed the art of Mohiniyattam beyond India. The first Russian dancer, Mohiniyattam, was Milana Severskaya. In 1997, Kalamandalam Kalyanikutty Amma blessed her on the continuation of the Mohiniyattam tradition. Milana Severskaya created in St. Petersburg, Russia the first outside India school of education Mohiniattam. She founded the Natya Theater, where you can see the choreography Kalamandalam Kalyanikutty Amma in the play, dedicated to her memory. Milana Siverskaya has released a film dedicated to the memory of the guru Kalyanikutty Amma in which one can see how the guru taught dance in deep old age.

References

External links 
About Kalamandalam Kallyanikutty Amma
IGNCA Documentations
IGNCA Documentations
Narthaki.com Profiles/Kalamandalam Kalayanikutty Amma
Mohiniyattom ManoramaOnline.com Articles on Culture

See also 
 Kalamandalam Krishnan Nair
 Indian women in dance
 Smitha Rajan

Malayali people
Dancers from Kerala
1915 births
1999 deaths
Performers of Indian classical dance
Mohiniyattam exponents
Indian dance teachers
Indian female classical dancers
Recipients of the Sangeet Natak Akademi Award
People from Malappuram district
20th-century Indian dancers
Women educators from Kerala
Teachers of Indian classical dance
20th-century Indian educators
20th-century Indian women artists
Educators from Kerala
Women artists from Kerala
20th-century women educators
Recipients of the Kerala Sangeetha Nataka Akademi Fellowship
Recipients of the Kerala Sangeetha Nataka Akademi Award